Cambridge Observatory is an astronomical observatory at the University of Cambridge in the East of England. It was established in 1823 and is now part of the site of the Institute of Astronomy. The old Observatory building houses the Institute of Astronomy Library which has a collection of modern and historical astronomical books.

There are a set of optical telescopes at the site on the Madingley Road in the west of Cambridge.  By modern standards these are small, as well as being affected by light pollution.  Nevertheless, the 36-inch telescope continues to be used for studies of stellar radial velocities and the historic Northumberland and Thorrowgood telescopes are used as part of the public outreach activities of the Institute. Much more significant is the Mullard Radio Astronomy Observatory, built in 1957, a few kilometres southwest.

From 1990 to 1998, the Royal Greenwich Observatory was based in Cambridge in Greenwich House, just to the north of the Observatory.

Notable Senior Observers
John Couch Adams
Hugh Ernest Butler
Arthur Eddington
Hugh Newall
Robert Woodhouse

See also
List of largest optical telescopes in the British Isles

References

External links 

 Institute of Astronomy website
 Institute of Astronomy Library website

Astronomical observatories in England
Observatory
Observatory